Elmas is a Turkish surname. Notable people with the surname include:
 Elif Elmas (born 1999), Macedonian footballer 
 Ferdi Elmas (born 1985), Turkish footballer 
 Fevzi Elmas (born 1983), Turkish footballer
 Omer Elmas (born 1968 or 1969), Turkish Olympic wrestler
 Stéphan Elmas (1862-1937), Armenian composer

Turkish-language surnames